Muaythai at the 2017 Asian Indoor and Martial Arts Games was held at the Muay Kickboxing Arena in Ashgabat, Turkmenistan from 17 to 21 September 2017.

Medalists

Men

Women

Medal table

Results

Men

54 kg

57 kg

60 kg

63.5 kg

67 kg

71 kg

75 kg

81 kg

86 kg

Women

51 kg

54 kg

57 kg

60 kg

63.5 kg

References 

 Medalists

External links 
 Official website

2017 Asian Indoor and Martial Arts Games events
2017
Indoor and Martial Arts Games
Indoor and Martial Arts Games